Harriette Pituley (born 1958) is a Canadian International lawn bowler.

Biography
In 2007, Pituley won the triples and fours bronze medals at the Atlantic Bowls Championships. 

Four years later she won another bronze medal but this time in the fours at the 2011 Asia Pacific Bowls Championships in Adelaide. She has won six Canadian National titles.

She was selected to represent Canada at the 2010 Commonwealth Games, where she competed in the triples event.

References

1958 births
Living people
Canadian female bowls players
Bowls players at the 2010 Commonwealth Games
Commonwealth Games competitors for Canada
20th-century Canadian women